Sääsküla is a village in Luunja Parish, Tartu County in eastern Estonia.

Painter and art historian Eduard Ahas (1901–1944) was killed in Kangro farmstead in Sääsküla following the Tartu Offensive. A memorial plaque was opened in 1998.

References

Villages in Tartu County